Caroline King Duer (1865 – January 23, 1956) was an editor at Vogue magazine and writer.

Biography
She was born in 1865, and her sister was Alice Duer Miller.

References

External links
 
 

1865 births
1956 deaths
American magazine editors
Women magazine editors
Vogue (magazine) people
19th-century American women writers
20th-century American women writers